Prayaga Rose Martin (born 18 May 1995) is an Indian actor who predominantly works in Malayalam cinema. In 2012, she made her cinematic debut in the Malayalam film, Ustad Hotel.

Career
Director Mysskin cast Prayaga Martin for her first lead role in Pissasu. In 2016, Prayaga played her second lead role as Parvathy in the movie, Oru Murai Vanthu Parthaya, opposite Unni Mukundan. The film was well received by Malayalam moviegoers. In the same year, she replaced Madonna Sebastian in Siddhique's Fukri. She also played the female lead, alongside Dileep and Radhika Sarathkumar, in the political thriller Ramaleela. She made her debut in Kannada in a Ganesh starrer, Geetha. She has acted as judge of several TV shows like Midukki, Thakarppan Comedy , Star Magic and Comedy Stars Season 3.

Filmography

Television

Web series

Short films

References

External links
 
 

Living people
Indian film actresses
Tamil actresses
Actresses from Kochi
1995 births
21st-century Indian child actresses
Actresses in Malayalam cinema
Actresses in Tamil cinema
Child actresses in Malayalam cinema
Actresses in Kannada cinema
St. Teresa's College alumni
Actresses in Malayalam television